Silvio Ranieri (1882 – 1956) was an Italian Mandolin virtuoso. Born in Rome, he gave his first concert in 1897, aged fifteen, and he went on to tour Europe to great acclaim. It was his desire to elevate the Mandolin to a status similar to the violin in classical music, and he did much to contribute to the immense popularity of the mandolin in the 1920s. Later settling in Brussels he established a tradition of Mandolin music in northern Europe. He always played Mandolins produced by Luigi Embergher, which he compared to the Stradivarius violin in perfection. Ranieri once visited Embergher's shop in Rome and tried out an instrument marked Gold Medal Paris 1900. When he wanted to buy it the luthier replied that it was not for sale, but that he could play it at the evening recital. After the recital Embergher approached Ranieri and offered him the instrument as a gift.

References

See also
 List of mandolinists (sorted)

1882 births
1956 deaths
Italian classical mandolinists
20th-century classical musicians